Tatyana Vladimirovna Dolmatova (born 14 September 1992) is a footballer who plays as a midfielder for Shirak-Homenmen. Born in Russia, she represents the Armenia women's national team.

International career
Dolmatova capped for Armenia at senior level in two friendlies against Lithuania on 4 and 6 March 2020.

See also
List of Armenia women's international footballers

References

1992 births
Living people
Women's association football midfielders
Russian women's footballers
Russian Women's Football Championship players
Russian emigrants to Armenia
Naturalized citizens of Armenia
Armenian women's footballers
Armenia women's international footballers